The Christmas Tree Ruin is an archaeological site containing a Navajo pueblito, a defensive structure built in a high cliff wall approximately 200 feet above the floor of Gobernador Canyon in northwestern New Mexico, United States. The ruin, which is believed to have been built by the Navajo,  dates to the 18th century, and was probably used for defensive, storage, and habitation purposes.

The site is situated on a ledge and within a rock shelter. The ruin consists of a walled rock shelter and a burned rock pile. The walled area is accessible only by ladder.

See also

Adolfo Canyon Site (LA 5665)
Dinétah
Navajo pueblitos
National Register of Historic Places listings in San Juan County, New Mexico

References

Archaeological sites on the National Register of Historic Places in New Mexico
Buildings and structures in San Juan County, New Mexico
Bureau of Land Management areas in New Mexico
History of San Juan County, New Mexico
Navajo history
Ruins in the United States
Rock shelters in the United States
National Register of Historic Places in San Juan County, New Mexico